Kishi-Karoy or Kishi Karaoy, meaning "Little Karoy", is a bittern salt lake in Akzhar District, North Kazakhstan Region, Kazakhstan.

Kishi-Karoy village, formerly Kievskoye, Bostandyk, Baytus and Kenashchi, formerly Menzhinskoye,  are the nearest inhabited localities.

Geography
Kishi-Karoy lies in the southern part of the Ishim Plain, the southernmost sector of the West Siberian Plain. It is an endorheic lake located at the bottom of a depression. Larger lake Ulken-Karoy (Big Karoy) lies to the east and Kalibek and Alabota to the southwest. In the summer Kishi-Karoy shrinks and becomes hypersaline and in years of drought the lake may dry completely up.

Kishi-Karoy is surrounded by salt marshes. The bottom is flat, in parts clayey. The lake is mainly fed by snow. No significant rivers feed its waters.

Flora
Kishi-Karoy is surrounded by the arid Kazakh Steppe landscape where the main vegetation is sagebrush and fescue.

See also
List of lakes of Kazakhstan

References

External links

На севере Казахстана призвали беречь экосистему солёного озера Киши-Карой - Петропавловск.news (in Russian)
Expeditions along the watersheds of the middle forest-steppe of the Omsk region (in Russian)
ИНТЕЛЛЕКТУАЛЬНАЯ НАЦИЯ В ФОКУСЕ ГУМАНИТАРНЫХ ТЕХНОЛОГИЙ (in Russian)

Lakes of Kazakhstan
Endorheic lakes of Asia
North Kazakhstan Region
West Siberian Plain